The 2000 Utah State Aggies football team represented Utah State University in the 2000 NCAA Division I-A football season as a member of the Big West Conference. The Aggies were led by first-year head coach Mick Dennehy. The Aggies played their home games at Romney Stadium in Logan, Utah. Utah State finished with a 5–6 record.

Schedule

References

Utah State
Utah State Aggies football seasons
Utah State Aggies football